is a subregion of Kyushu.

This northern region encompasses the prefectures of Fukuoka, Saga, Nagasaki, Kumamoto, and Ōita.

History

Before 1963 it was called North Kyushu (Kitakyūshū, 北九州) until the city of Kitakyūshū was formed.  The name of the city means North Kyushu in Japanese.  To avoid confusion the name of the region was changed.

It is the most urbanized and industrialized part of the Kyushu region.

For the purposes of development analysis, the area is construed to include Yamaguchi Prefecture on Honshū. Although Yamaguchi is not part of Kyushu, it is a functional satellite of the Kanmon Straits metropolitan area.

The region is part of the Taiheiyō Belt and comprises the Northern Kyushu Industrial Zone (:ja:北九州工業地帯)

See also
 Fukuoka-Kitakyūshū
 Kyūshū
 Southern Kyūshū

Notes

References
 Nussbaum, Louis-Frédéric and Käthe Roth. (2005).  Japan encyclopedia. Cambridge: Harvard University Press. ;  OCLC 58053128

External links
 Kyushu Tourism Information,  Northern Kyushu maps